Rachel Uchitel (born January 29, 1975) is an American nightclub manager, hostess, and TV correspondent. She first encountered publicity when, 
following the September 11 attacks, a photo of her holding a picture of her fiancé, who worked in the World Trade Center, was published on the front page of the New York Post and circulated worldwide. She made headlines again in 2010 as one of golfer Tiger Woods' mistresses. In 2010, she appeared in the fourth season of the American reality television series Celebrity Rehab with Dr. Drew.

Early life
Uchitel is the daughter of Robert N. Uchitel (1946–1990) and the granddaughter of Maurice Uchitel (1911-2000) a restaurant and nightclub owner born in the Russian Empire. He owned several establishments in the 1950s and 1960s, including the El Morocco nightclub. Her surname Uchitel means "teacher" in Russian and several other Slavic languages.

At the age of 13, she was sent to CEDU School in Running Springs, California where she claims she was made to dig a grave with a spoon and then lay in it. Several years later, CEDU would be shutdown after losing several lawsuits for battery, neglect, racketeering, invasion of privacy, and child abuse. 
 
In 1990, her father died of a cocaine overdose. According to Uchitel, her father's death required her to mature quickly and was one of the incidents in her life that led to her own addictions later.<ref name=CelebRehabEpisodes>Uchitel discusses these issues in Episodes 1 and 6 of [[Celebrity Rehab with Dr. Drew#Season 4|Celebrity Rehab'''s fourth season]], which premiered on December 1 and December 22, 2010, respectively.</ref>

She graduated from Millbrook School in 1992 and graduated from the University of New Hampshire in 1996 with a degree in psychology.  She spent five years after college as a news producer in New York for Bloomberg Television.

Career

Television
Uchitel began her career after college working in television and film, with a five-year stint as a producer in the Bloomberg News television division, a period in which she became "engaged to a man who died in the 9/11 attacks." Uchitel has served as a special correspondent on nightlife for Extra.

VIP hosting
In 2005, Uchitel moved to Las Vegas and was a VIP hostess at the Tao in Las Vegas, Nevada, the following year, and whose ownership included occasional boyfriend Jason Strauss. She said, "In a random career move and a life-changing experience, I found myself living in Las Vegas to launch Tao nightclub and restaurant.... Two years later, I was back in New York to oversee VIP operations for all of their companies and venues, such as Stanton Social, Marquee, Tao Bistro, and Dune.
Uchitel ran the VIP section of "some of the most successful clubs in New York." As of 2009, Uchitel was living in Las Vegas but self-described as "too old for being a VIP host anymore".

Other endeavors
In December 2013, Uchitel opened a children's boutique on the Upper West Side of Manhattan. The store was named Wyatt Lily after her 2-year-old daughter and was named "Best Kids Birthday Presents" in New York magazine's annual Best Of issue in 2015. It has since closed down.

Media appearances
Uchitel was a cast member in the fourth season of the VH1 reality television program Celebrity Rehab with Dr. Drew which documents notable persons being treated for substance abuse – in her case, alcohol, opiates, and benzodiazepines. Dr. Drew Pinsky, who normally is not involved with casting for the series reportedly visited Uchitel personally in order to convince her to be cast on the show, for which she was paid $500,000 to appear – double the amount initially offered to her by producers.

Personal life
Uchitel had been engaged to James Andrew O'Grady, a managing director of Sandler O’Neill who was killed in the September 11 attacks of the World Trade Center.  A few days later she appeared on the front page of the New York Post holding a picture of O'Grady, which was republished worldwide. ("The image of Rachel Uchitel making an emotional plea as she searches for her fiancé in Manhattan was used in newspapers worldwide.") Uchitel and her fiancé's family subsequently debated the disposition of his estate.

In 2004, Uchitel married Wall Street trader and childhood friend Steven Ehrenkranz. Their marriage lasted four months.

In late 2009, The National Enquirer'' published a story that alleged that Uchitel had had an affair with Tiger Woods at the Australian Masters, an allegation Uchitel denied to the Associated Press.

In 2010, actor David Boreanaz admitted to having an affair with Uchitel, who he claimed tried to blackmail him. At the time of the affair Boreanaz's wife was pregnant.
     
On October 2, 2011 she married insurance underwriter and former Penn State fullback Matt Hahn. In May  2012, Uchitel gave birth to a daughter. Hahn filed for divorce from Uchitel in 2013. The divorce was finalized in January 2014.

References and notes

External links
 

1975 births
American people of Ukrainian descent
American people of Ukrainian-Jewish descent
Living people
Place of birth missing (living people)
People from Manhattan
University of New Hampshire alumni
Nightclub managers
People from Anchorage, Alaska
Television personalities from New York City
American women television personalities